Goya Jaekel (born 25 October 1974) is a former professional German football player.

Playing career 
Jaekel, a striker by trade, represented Germany at the 1991 FIFA U-17 World Championship, scoring two goals in four games before being knocked out in the quarter-finals by Spain.

He signed for Hertha BSC in 1995 after coming through the ranks of local Berliner teams BFC Viktoria 1889 and BFC Preussen. At the end of the 1994–95 2. Bundesliga season, he made two substitute appearances for Hertha at the Olympic Stadium. Following spells at Kickers Emden and SC Verl in the latter half of the 1990s, the forward signed for Tennis Borussia Berlin and made 12 appearances for the Veilchen in the Regionalliga-Nord. Jaekel later played for SV Tasmania-Gropiusstadt 1973 and VfB Concordia Britz before moving back to his youth team BFC Viktoria 1889 and saw out the twilight of his playing career in the Brandenburg-Liga for Prignitzer Kuckuck Kickers.

References

External links 
 

1974 births
Living people
German footballers
Germany youth international footballers
Association football forwards
2. Bundesliga players
BFC Preussen players
Hertha BSC players
Kickers Emden players
SC Verl players
Tennis Borussia Berlin players
Place of birth missing (living people)